Ryan Thomas Gosling (born November 12, 1980) is a Canadian actor. Prominent in independent film, he has also worked in blockbuster films of varying genres, and has accrued a worldwide box office gross of over 1.9 billion USD. He has received various accolades, including a Golden Globe Award, and nominations for two Academy Awards and a BAFTA Award.

Born and raised in Canada, he rose to prominence at age 13 for being a child star on the Disney Channel's The Mickey Mouse Club (1993–1995), and went on to appear in other family entertainment programs, including Are You Afraid of the Dark? (1995) and Goosebumps (1996). His first film role was as a Jewish neo-Nazi in The Believer (2001), and he went on to star in several independent films, including Murder by Numbers (2002), The Slaughter Rule (2002), and The United States of Leland (2003).

Gosling gained wider recognition and stardom for the 2004 romance film The Notebook. This was followed by starring roles in a string of critically acclaimed independent dramas including Half Nelson (2006), for which he was nominated for the Academy Award for Best Actor, Lars and the Real Girl (2007), and Blue Valentine (2010). Gosling co-starred in three mainstream films in 2011, the romantic comedy Crazy, Stupid, Love, the political drama The Ides of March, and the action drama Drive, all of which were critical and commercial successes. He then starred in the acclaimed financial satire The Big Short (2015) and the romantic musical La La Land (2016), the latter of which won him the Golden Globe Award for Best Actor and a second Academy Award nomination for Best Actor. Further acclaim followed with the science fiction thriller Blade Runner 2049 (2017) and the biopic First Man (2018). In addition to acting, he made his directorial debut with Lost River (2014).

Gosling's band, Dead Man's Bones, released their self-titled debut album and toured North America in 2009. He is a co-owner of Tagine, a Moroccan restaurant in Beverly Hills, California. Gosling is a supporter of PETA, Invisible Children, and the Enough Project and has traveled to Chad, Uganda and eastern Congo to raise awareness about conflicts in the regions. Gosling has been involved in peace promotion efforts in Africa for over a decade. He is in a relationship with actress Eva Mendes, with whom he has two daughters.

Early life and education
Ryan Thomas Gosling was born on November 12, 1980, at St. Joseph's Hospital in London, Ontario, the son of Thomas Ray Gosling, a traveling salesman for a paper mill, and Donna, a secretary. Both of his parents are of part French Canadian descent, along with some German, English, Scottish, and Irish. He and his family were members of the Church of Jesus Christ of Latter-day Saints, and Gosling has said that the religion influenced every aspect of their lives. Because of his father's work, they "moved around a lot" and Gosling lived in both Cornwall, Ontario and Burlington, Ontario. His parents divorced when he was 13, and he and his older sister Mandi lived with their mother, an experience Gosling has credited with programming him "to think like a girl".

Gosling was educated at Gladstone Public School, Cornwall Collegiate and Vocational School and Lester B. Pearson High School. As a child, he watched Dick Tracy and was inspired to become an actor. He "hated" being a child, was bullied in elementary school, and had no friends until he was "14 or 15". In grade one, having been heavily influenced by the action film First Blood, he took steak knives to school and threw them at other children during recess. This incident led to a suspension. He was unable to read, and was evaluated for attention deficit hyperactivity disorder (ADHD), but was not diagnosed with it and, contrary to false reports, never took medication. His mother left her job and home-schooled him for a year. He has said homeschooling gave him "a sense of autonomy that I've never really lost". Gosling performed in front of audiences from an early age, encouraged by his sister being a performer. He and his sister sang together at weddings; he performed with Elvis Perry, his uncle's Elvis Presley tribute act, and was involved with a local ballet company. Performing boosted his self-confidence as it was the only thing for which he received praise. He developed an idiosyncratic accent because, as a child, he thought having a Canadian accent did not sound "tough". He began to model his accent on that of Marlon Brando. He dropped out of high school at age seventeen to focus on his acting career.

Acting career

1993–1999: Child actor
In 1993, twelve-year-old Gosling attended an open audition in Montreal for a revival of the Disney Channel's The Mickey Mouse Club. He was given a two-year contract as a mouseketeer and moved to Orlando, Florida. He appeared on-screen infrequently because other children were considered more talented. Nonetheless, he has described the job as the greatest two years of his life. Fellow cast members included Britney Spears, Christina Aguilera, and Justin Timberlake. Gosling has credited the experience with instilling in them "this great sense of focus." He became particularly close friends with Timberlake and they lived together for six months during the second year of the show. Timberlake's mother became Gosling's legal guardian after his mother returned to Canada for work reasons. Gosling has said that even though he and Timberlake talk infrequently, they are still supportive of each other.

Following the show's cancellation in 1995, Gosling returned to Canada, where he continued to appear in family entertainment television series, including Are You Afraid of the Dark? (1995) and Goosebumps (1996), and starred in Breaker High (1997–98) as Sean Hanlon. At age eighteen, he moved to New Zealand to film the Fox Kids adventure series Young Hercules (1998–1999) as the title character. He later said that he initially enjoyed working on the series, but began to care too much about the show, so it was no longer fun for him. He wanted to spend more time sitting with and devising a character as well as play a variety of roles, so he chose to transition into film and not accept any more television work.

2000–2003: Move to independent film
Aged 19, Gosling decided to move into "serious acting". He was dropped by his agent and initially found it difficult to secure work because of the "stigma" attached to children's television. After a supporting role in the football drama Remember the Titans, he secured a lead role as a young Jewish neo-Nazi in 2001's The Believer. Director Henry Bean said he cast Gosling because his Mormon upbringing helped him understand the isolation of Judaism. Kevin Thomas of the Los Angeles Times praised an "electrifying and terrifyingly convincing" performance while Todd McCarthy of Variety felt his "dynamite performance" could "scarcely have been better". The film won the Grand Jury Prize at the Sundance Film Festival and Gosling has described it as "the film that kind of gift-wrapped for me the career that I have now." Because of the controversial nature of the film, it was difficult to secure financial backing for a full theatrical release, and the film was instead broadcast on Showtime. The film was a commercial failure, grossing $416,925 worldwide from a production budget of $1.5 million.

In 2002, Gosling co-starred in the psychological thriller Murder by Numbers with Sandra Bullock and Michael Pitt, where Gosling and Pitt portrayed a pair of high school seniors who believe they can commit the perfect murder. Bullock played the detective tasked with investigating the crime. Lisa Schwarzbaum of Entertainment Weekly described him as "a phenomenal talent even in junk like this" while Todd McCarthy felt that the "strong and "charismatic" young actors were "let down by the screenplay". The film was a minor commercial success, grossing $56 million worldwide from a production budget of $50 million. His second screen appearance of 2002 was in The Slaughter Rule with David Morse which explores the relationship between a high school football player and his troubled coach in rural Montana. Gosling has said that the opportunity to work with Morse made him "a better actor". Stephen Holden of The New York Times described Gosling as "major star material" with a "rawness and an intensity that recall the young Matt Dillon" while Manohla Dargis of the Los Angeles Times was won over by his "raw talent". The film was released in just three US theatres and grossed $13,411.

In 2003, Gosling starred in The United States of Leland as a teenager imprisoned for the murder of a disabled boy. He was drawn to the role because it was unusual to find a character that was "emotionally disconnected for the whole film." Critic Roger Ebert felt that the "gifted actor does everything that can be done with Leland, but the character comes from a writer's conceits, not from life." A. O. Scott of The New York Times noted that he "struggles to rescue Leland from the clutches of cliché" while David Rooney of Variety felt that his "one-note, blankly disturbed act has none of the magnetic edge of his breakthrough work in The Believer". The film grossed $343,847 in the United States and was not released overseas.

2004–2009: The Notebook and Half Nelson
Gosling gained mainstream attention in 2004 after starring opposite fellow Canadian Rachel McAdams in the romantic drama film The Notebook, a film adaptation of Nicholas Sparks' novel of the same name, directed by Nick Cassavetes. Gosling played Noah Calhoun and commented on the role: "It gave me an opportunity to play a character over a period of time – from 1940 to 1946 – that was quite profound and formative." He sought to imbue his character with "quiet strength" and was inspired by Sam Shepard's performance in Days of Heaven. Shepard co-starred in The Notebook. Filming took place in Charleston, South Carolina, in late 2002 and early 2003. Although Gosling and McAdams became romantically involved in 2005, they had a combative relationship on the set. "We inspired the worst in each other," Gosling has said. "It was a strange experience, making a love story and not getting along with your co-star in any way." At one point, Gosling asked Cassavetes to "bring somebody else in for my off-camera shot" because he felt McAdams was uncooperative. The New York Times praised the "spontaneous and combustible" performances of the two leads and noted that, "against your better judgment, you root for the pair to beat the odds against them." Desson Thomson of The Washington Post praised Gosling's "beguiling unaffectedness" and noted that "it's hard not to like these two or begrudge them a great love together". The film grossed over $115 million worldwide. Gosling won four Teen Choice Awards and an MTV Movie Award. Entertainment Weekly has said that the movie contains the All-Time Best Movie Kiss while the Los Angeles Times has included a scene from the film in a list of the 50 Classic Movie Kisses. The Notebook has appeared on many Most Romantic Movies lists.

In 2005, Gosling appeared as a disturbed young art student in Stay, a psychological thriller film co-starring Naomi Watts and Ewan McGregor. In an uncomplimentary review of the film, Manohla Dargis of The New York Times stated that Gosling "like his fans, deserves better." Todd McCarthy remarked that the "capable" Gosling and McGregor "deliver nothing new from what they've shown before". The film grossed $8 million worldwide. Gosling was unfazed by the negative reaction: "I had a kid come up to me on the street, 10 years old, and he says, 'Are you that guy from Stay? What the f--- was that movie about?' I think that's great. I'm just as proud if someone says, 'Hey, you made me sick in that movie,' as if they say I made them cry."

Gosling next starred in 2006's Half Nelson as a drug-addicted junior high school teacher who forms a bond with a young student. To prepare for the role, Gosling moved to New York for one month before shooting began. He lived in a small apartment in Brooklyn and spent time shadowing an eighth grade teacher. Kenneth Turan of the Los Angeles Times described it as "a mesmerizing performance ... that shows the kind of deep understanding of character few actors manage." Ruthe Stein of the San Francisco Chronicle drew comparisons with Marlon Brando and asserted that "nobody who cares about great acting will want to miss his performance". Roger Ebert believed that his performance "proves he's one of the finest actors working in contemporary movies." Gosling garnered a nomination for the Academy Award for Best Actor. The film grossed $4 million at the worldwide box office. In 2007, he was invited to join the Academy of Motion Picture Arts and Sciences.

Gosling played an introvert who falls for a sex doll in the 2007 film Lars and the Real Girl. He drew inspiration from James Stewart's performance in Harvey. Roger Ebert felt "a film about a life-sized love doll" had been turned into "a life-affirming statement of hope" because of "a performance by Ryan Gosling that says things that cannot be said". Ann Hornaday of The Washington Post described his performance as "a small miracle ... because he changes and grows so imperceptibly before our eyes." However, Manohla Dargis of The New York Times felt "the performance is a rare miscalculation in a mostly brilliant career." He was nominated for a Golden Globe Award for Best Actor – Motion Picture Musical or Comedy. The film was a box office failure, failing to recoup its $12 million production budget. Gosling starred opposite Anthony Hopkins in the 2007 courtroom thriller Fracture. He originally turned down the role, but changed his mind when Hopkins signed on. Gosling noted that he was drawn to his character, Willie, because he had flaws and seemed like a real person. He spent time shadowing lawyers and observing courtroom proceedings in preparation for the role. Claudia Puig of USA Today declared that "watching a veteran like Hopkins verbally joust with one of the best young actors in Hollywood is worth the price of admission". Manohla Dargis of The New York Times felt it was a treat to watch "the spectacle of that crafty scene stealer Anthony Hopkins mixing it up with that equally cunning screen nibbler Ryan Gosling ... Each actor is playing a pulp type rather than a fully formed individual, but both fill in the blanks with an alchemical mix of professional and personal charisma." The film grossed over $91 million worldwide.

Gosling was scheduled to begin filming The Lovely Bones in 2007. However, he left the production two days before filming began because of "creative differences" and was replaced by Mark Wahlberg. Gosling was cast as the father of the murdered teenage girl and initially felt he was too young for the role. The director Peter Jackson and the producer Fran Walsh persuaded him that he could be aged with hair and make-up changes. Before shooting began, Gosling gained 60 pounds (27 kilograms) in weight and grew a beard to appear older. Walsh then "began to feel he was not right. It was our blindness, the desire to make it work no matter what." Gosling later said, "We didn't talk very much during the preproduction process, which was the problem ... I just showed up on set, and I had gotten it wrong. Then I was fat and unemployed." He has said the experience was "an important realisation for me: not to let your ego get involved. It's OK to be too young for a role."

2010–2012: Widespread recognition
Following a three-year absence from the screen, Gosling starred in five films in 2010 and 2011. "I've never had more energy," Gosling said. "I'm more excited to make films than I used to be. I used to kind of dread it. It was so emotional and taxing. But I've found a way to have fun while doing it. And I think that translates into the films." He has also spoken of feeling depressed when not working. In 2010, he starred opposite Michelle Williams in Derek Cianfrance's directorial debut, the marital drama Blue Valentine. The low-budget film was mainly improvised and Gosling has said "you had to remind yourself you were making a film". Mick LaSalle of the San Francisco Chronicle felt he "brings a preternatural understanding of people to his performance" while A.O. Scott of The New York Times found him to be "convincing as the run-down, desperate, older Dean, and maybe a bit less so as the younger version". Owen Gleiberman of Entertainment Weekly wrote that he "plays Dean as a snarky working-class hipster, but when his anger is unleashed, the performance turns powerful." However, Wesley Morris of The Boston Globe felt the performance was an example of "hipsterism misdirected". He was nominated for a Golden Globe Award for Best Actor – Motion Picture Drama. The film was a box office success, grossing over $12 million worldwide from a production budget of $1 million.

Gosling's second on-screen appearance of 2010 was in the mystery film All Good Things with Kirsten Dunst, based on a true story. He played the role of New York real-estate heir David Marks, who was investigated for the disappearance of his wife (played by Dunst). Gosling found the filming process to be a "dark experience" and did not undertake any promotional duties for the film. When asked if he was proud of the film, he said, "I'm proud of what Kirsten does in the movie." Peter Travers of Rolling Stone wrote that he "gets so deep into character you can feel his nerve endings." Mick LaSalle of the San Francisco Chronicle found the "chameleonic Gosling is completely convincing as this empty shell of a man". Betsy Sharkey of the Los Angeles Times felt that the film belonged to Dunst, but praised Gosling's performance. The film grossed $644,535 worldwide. Also in 2010, Gosling narrated and produced ReGeneration, a documentary that explores the cynicism in today's youth towards social and political causes.

2011 saw Gosling expand his horizons by appearing in three diverse, high-profile roles. He co-starred in his first comedic role in the romantic comedy-drama Crazy, Stupid, Love, with Steve Carell and Emma Stone. Gosling took cocktail-making classes at a Los Angeles bar in preparation for his role as a smooth-talking ladies' man. Ann Hornaday of The Washington Post said his "seductive command presence suggests we may have found our next George Clooney". Peter Travers declared him "a comic knockout" while Claudia Puig of USA Today felt he reveals a "surprising" "knack for comedy." He was nominated for a Golden Globe Award for Best Actor – Motion Picture Musical or Comedy. The film was a box office success, grossing over $142 million worldwide. With adjustments for inflation, it is the second most successful of Gosling's career.

Gosling's first action role was in Drive, based on a novel by James Sallis. Gosling played a Hollywood stunt performer who moonlights as a getaway driver, and he has described the film as a "violent John Hughes movie": "I always thought if Pretty in Pink had head-smashing it would be perfect". Roger Ebert compared Gosling to Steve McQueen and stated that he "embodies presence and sincerity ... he has shown a gift for finding arresting, powerful characters [and] can achieve just about anything. Joe Morgenstern of The Wall Street Journal pondered "the ongoing mystery of how he manages to have so much impact with so little apparent effort. It's irresistible to liken his economical style to that of Marlon Brando." The film was a box office success, grossing $70 million worldwide from a production budget of $15 million.

In his final appearance of 2011, Gosling co-starred with Philip Seymour Hoffman in the political drama The Ides of March directed by George Clooney, in which he played an ambitious press secretary. Gosling partly decided to do the film to become more politically aware: "I'm Canadian and so American politics aren't really in my wheelhouse." Joe Morganstern stated that Gosling and Hoffman "are eminently well equipped to play variations on their characters' main themes. Yet neither actor has great material to conjure with in the script." In a generally tepid review, Kenneth Turan of the Los Angeles Times asserted that it was "certainly involving to see the charismatic Gosling verbally spar with superb character actors like Hoffman and [Paul] Giamatti." Mick LaSalle of the San Francisco Chronicle felt there was "one aspect to the character that Gosling can't quite nail down, that might simply be outside his sphere, which is idealism." He was nominated for a Golden Globe Award for Best Actor – Motion Picture Drama. The film grossed $66 million worldwide.

2013–2014: Mixed reception and directorial debut

In 2013's crime thriller Gangster Squad, Gosling portrayed Sgt. Jerry Wooters, a 1940s LAPD officer who attempts to outsmart mob boss Mickey Cohen (played by Sean Penn). He was reunited with Emma Stone as his love interest, after their earlier pairing in Crazy, Stupid, Love. Stone has said she hopes they will find more projects to work together on. A.O. Scott of The New York Times described the film as an excuse for the cast "to earn some money trying out funny voices and suppressing whatever sense of nuance they might possess." Christy Lemire of The Boston Globe criticized Gosling's "weird, whispery voice" and his "barely developed, one-note" character. However, Betsy Sharkey of the Los Angeles Times felt that there was "a seductive power" in the scenes shared by Gosling and Stone: "But like too much else in the film, it's a scenario that is only half played out."

In The Place Beyond the Pines, a generational drama directed by Blue Valentines Derek Cianfrance, Gosling played Luke, a motorcycle stunt rider who robs banks to provide for his family. The shoot was described by Gosling as "the best experience I have ever had making a film." A. O. Scott of The New York Times praised his performance, writing: "Mr. Gosling's cool self-possession — the only thing he was allowed to display in "Drive" — is complicated, made interesting, by hints of childlike innocence and vulnerability." Scott Foundas of The Village Voice was unimpressed: "Gosling's character verges on parody ... Gosling uses a soft, wounded half-whisper that tells us this is all some kind of put-on ... It's a close variation on the role Gosling played to stronger effect in Nicolas Winding Refn's existential Hollywood thriller, Drive, where it was clear the character was meant to be an abstraction." David Denby of The New Yorker remarked that he "reprises his inexorable-loner routine". The film grossed $35 million worldwide from a production budget of $15 million.

Later in 2013, Gosling starred in the violent revenge drama Only God Forgives, directed by Drives Nicolas Winding Refn. Gosling undertook Muay Thai training in preparation for the role, and has described the script as "the strangest thing I've ever read". Both the film and his performance drew negative reviews. David Edelstein of New York magazine stated, "Gosling looked like a major actor as a skinhead in The Believer and a star in Half Nelson. Then he stopped acting and started posing. His performance in Only God Forgives (would God forgive that title?) is one long, moist stare". Stephen Holden of the New York Times criticized Gosling's inability "to give his automaton any suggestion of an inner life". Peter Travers of Rolling Stone commented that Gosling, while "meant to be a blank page for us to write on, often looks merely blank".

In early 2013, Gosling announced that he was taking a break from acting, stating, "I've lost perspective on what I'm doing. I think it's good for me to take a break and reassess why I'm doing it and how I'm doing it. And I think this is probably a good way to learn about that." Gosling's directorial debut Lost River competed in the Un Certain Regard section at the 2014 Cannes Film Festival. The "fantasy noir", written by Gosling, stars Christina Hendricks, Ben Mendelsohn, and Matt Smith. The film received largely unfavorable reviews. Peter Bradshaw of The Guardian found it "insufferably conceited" and remarked that Gosling had lost "any sense of proportion or humility." Robbie Collin of The Daily Telegraph described Lost River as "mind-bogglingly pleased with itself", while Varietys Justin Chang dismissed the "derivative" film as a "train-wreck."

2015–present: La La Land and return to film

In 2015, Gosling played a bond salesman in the ensemble financial satire The Big Short, a Best Picture nominee at the 2016 Academy Awards. David Sims of The Atlantic felt that he was "smarmily funny, somehow simultaneously magnetic and repulsive; after years wandering the halls of mediocre art cinema, it's wonderful to see him cut loose again." Peter Travers of Rolling Stone said: "Gosling, a virtuoso of verbal sleaze, talks directly to the camera, and he's volcanically fierce and funny." The following year, Gosling starred in the black comedy The Nice Guys, opposite Russell Crowe, and in Damien Chazelle's musical La La Land, for which he won the Golden Globe Award for Best Actor – Motion Picture Musical or Comedy and received his second Academy Award for Best Actor nomination. Robbie Collin praised his chemistry with co-star Emma Stone, writing: "Both stars are so attuned to each other's pace and flow that their repartee just seems to tumble out, perfectly formed." It emerged as one of his most commercially successful films, with earnings of over $440 million against its $30 million budget.

Gosling was signed on to work with Terrence Malick in 2004 on the biographical film Che, but later dropped out. He made an appearance in Malick's Song to Song (2017), which co-starred Christian Bale and Cate Blanchett. Also in 2017, he starred in Blade Runner 2049, a sequel to the 1982 science fiction film Blade Runner, directed by Denis Villeneuve and co-starring Harrison Ford, who reprised his role as Rick Deckard. Gosling's role was as Officer K, a "blade runner" working for the LAPD whose job it is to kill rogue bioengineered humans known as replicants. A. O. Scott found him to be perfectly cast, adding that his "ability to elicit sympathy while seeming too distracted to want it – his knack for making boredom look like passion and vice versa – makes him a perfect warm-blooded robot for our time". Despite being Gosling's largest box office opening, grossing $31.5 million domestically, the film generally underperformed at the box office.

In 2018, Gosling portrayed Neil Armstrong, the astronaut who became the first man to walk on the Moon in 1969, in Chazelle's biopic First Man, based on the book First Man: The Life of Neil A. Armstrong. Writing for IndieWire, Michael Nordine commended him for bringing "quiet charisma" and "grace" to his role, while Nicholas Barber of the BBC hailed him as the "best deadpan actor in the business".

In 2022, he starred in Netflix’s spy-action thriller The Gray Man, opposite Chris Evans.

Upcoming projects
Gosling is will next star in Greta Gerwig’s live-action adaptation based the eponymous fashion doll line Barbie, opposite Margot Robbie. Since 2017, Gosling has been attached to co-produce a film adaptation of Jeff Lemire’s 2012 graphic novel The Underwater Welder. Deadline confirmed in March 2020 that Gosling will produce and star in Project Hail Mary with Metro-Goldwyn-Mayer in negotiations to acquire the project, based on the Andy Weir novel centered on a solitary astronaut on a space ship who is trying to save Earth.

In late May 2020, Gosling was cast in the role of the Wolfman in Universal's reboot of The Wolf Man from 1941. The film will be directed by Derek Cianfrance, making Gosling's third collaboration with him. Later, Deadline reported in September 2020 that Gosling is set to star in an untitled stuntman drama from director David Leitch and screenwriter Drew Pearce, who previously worked together on the Fast and Furious spinoff Hobbs & Shaw under Universal. In April 2022, it was announced that the project, now titled The Fall Guy, began production with Gosling spotted filming scenes on the Sydney Harbour Bridge in the early hours of the morning.

In February 2021, Gosling signed to star in The Actor, an adaptation of Donald E. Westlake's novel Memory. Duke Johnson will direct the film and produce with Abigail Spencer under their Innerlight Films production banner. Gosling, who will also produce alongside Ken Kao, will play the lead role of Paul Cole, who must deal with his damaged memory as he struggles to rebuild his life after being left for dead and hospitalized in 1950s Ohio.

Music career

In 2007, Gosling made a solo recording called "Put Me in the Car" available for download on the Internet. Also that year, Gosling and his friend Zach Shields formed the indie rock band Dead Man's Bones. The two first met in 2005 when Gosling was dating Rachel McAdams and Shields was dating her sister, Kayleen. They initially conceived of the project as a monster-themed musical but settled on forming a band when they realized putting on a stage production would be too expensive. They recorded their eponymous debut album with the Silverlake Conservatory's Children's Choir and learned to play all the instruments themselves. Gosling contributed vocals, piano, guitar, bass guitar and cello to the record. The album was released through ANTI- Records on October 6, 2009. Pitchfork Media was won over by the "unique, catchy and lovably weird record" while Prefix felt the album was "rarely kitschy and never inappropriate". However, Spin felt the album "doesn't reverse the rule that actors make dubious pop musicians" and Entertainment Weekly criticized its "cloying, gothic preciousness".

In September 2009, Gosling and Shields had a three-night residency at LA's Bob Baker Marionette Theater where they performed alongside dancing neon skeletons and glowing ghosts. They then conducted a thirteen-date tour of North America in October 2009, using a local children's choir at every show. Instead of an opening act, a talent show was held each night. In September 2010, they performed at Los Angeles' FYF Festival. In 2011, the actor spoke of his intentions to record a second Dead Man's Bones album. No children's choir will be featured on the follow-up album because "it's not very rock 'n' roll".

Personal life

Gosling previously resided in New York City with his mixed-breed dog George. He co-owns Tagine, a Moroccan restaurant in Beverly Hills, California. He bought the restaurant on an impulse; he has said that he spent "all [his] money" on it, spent a year doing the renovation work himself, and now oversees the restaurant's menus.

Gosling dated his Murder by Numbers co-star Sandra Bullock from 2002 to 2003. He then had a relationship with his The Notebook co-star Rachel McAdams from 2005 to 2007, before they briefly reunited in 2008.

Gosling has been in a relationship with his The Place Beyond the Pines co-star Eva Mendes since September 2011. The couple have two daughters, one born in 2014 and the second in 2016.

Gosling is supportive of various social causes. He has worked with PETA on a campaign to encourage KFC and McDonald's to use improved methods of chicken slaughter in their factories, and on a campaign encouraging dairy farmers to stop de-horning cows. Gosling volunteered in Biloxi, Mississippi in 2005, as part of the clean-up effort following Hurricane Katrina. He is a supporter of Invisible Children, Inc., a group that raises awareness about the LRA in Central Africa. In 2005, Gosling traveled to Darfur refugee camps in Chad. He was a speaker at Campus Progress' National Conference in 2008 where he discussed Darfur. As part of his work with the Enough Project, he visited Uganda in 2007 and eastern Congo in 2010.

During the filming for Barbie, Gosling was seen wearing a fan made t-shirt of his co-star Ncuti Gatwa as the Fourteenth Doctor from Doctor Who to show his support for their casting. He has previously expressed admiration for actor Matt Smith, who played the Eleventh Doctor, which led him to cast the actor for his film Lost River.

Filmography

Film

Television

Discography

Accolades and nominations

Among his many accolades, Gosling has received two Academy Award nominations, a British Academy Film Award nomination, one Golden Globe Award from five nominations, and four Screen Actors Guild Award nominations.

In 2006, his role as a troubled history teacher in the drama film Half Nelson garnered him wide critical recognition and nominations for the Academy Award and Screen Actors Guild Award for Best Actor. Ten years later, he received further recognition for his role as a struggling jazz pianist in the musical romance film La La Land (2016), and he won the Golden Globe Award and was nominated for the Academy Award, British Academy Film Award and Screen Actors Guild Award for Best Actor. In between Half Nelson and La La Land, Gosling received other recognition for his roles in Lars and the Real Girl (2007), Blue Valentine (2010), The Ides of March and Crazy, Stupid, Love (both 2011); all of which earned him Golden Globe nominations, with Lars and the Real Girl also earning him a SAG nomination. His Golden Globe nominations for The Ides of March and Crazy, Stupid, Love in the respective categories of Best Actor – Drama and Best Actor – Musical or Comedy made him one of few actors to be nominated in both leading role categories in the same year. As a member of the ensemble cast of the biographical comedy-drama film The Big Short (2015), he was nominated for the Screen Actors Guild Award for Outstanding Motion Picture Cast.

German television prank
In March 2017, Gosling was at the center of a prank involving Goldene Kamera, an annual German film and television award. German comedians Joko Winterscheidt and Klaas Heufer-Umlauf arranged for a Ryan Gosling impersonator to be awarded the "Best International Film" prize for La La Land. Following the event, a speaker for television broadcaster ZDF asked for the trophy to be given back, stating that La La Land had won the prize and that the trophy would be given to the real Ryan Gosling. The incident, which became known as "GoslingGate", sparked criticism of the event's concept. Media critics argued that the "Best International Film" award had only been created in an effort to get Ryan Gosling on the show, with no regards for the movie's quality. The incident played a major role in the cancelation of the Goldene Kamera in 2019. In 2018, Winterscheidt, Heufer-Umlauf and the Gosling double Ludwig Lehner were awarded the Grimme Award for their media criticism.

See also
List of Canadian actors
List of Canadian Academy Award winners and nominees
List of oldest and youngest Academy Award winners and nominees – Youngest nominees for Best Actor in a Leading Role
List of actors with Academy Award nominations
List of actors with two or more Academy Award nominations in acting categories

References

Further reading

External links

 
 
 

1980 births
Living people
20th-century Canadian male actors
21st-century Canadian male actors
21st-century Canadian male musicians
Best Musical or Comedy Actor Golden Globe (film) winners
Canadian documentary film producers
Canadian expatriate film directors in the United States
Canadian expatriate male actors in the United States
Canadian expatriate musicians in the United States
Canadian expatriate writers in the United States
Film producers from Ontario
Canadian folk rock musicians
Canadian indie rock musicians
Canadian male child actors
Canadian male film actors
Canadian male television actors
Canadian male voice actors
Canadian people of English descent
Canadian people of French descent
Canadian people of German descent
Canadian people of Irish descent
Canadian people of Scottish descent
Canadian philanthropists
Canadian restaurateurs
Film directors from London, Ontario
Former Latter Day Saints
Franco-Ontarian people
Independent Spirit Award for Best Male Lead winners
Male actors from London, Ontario
Mouseketeers
Musicians from London, Ontario
People from Burlington, Ontario
People from Cornwall, Ontario
Writers from London, Ontario